John Chris Kiriakou (born August 9, 1964) is an American author, journalist and former intelligence officer. Kiriakou is a columnist with Reader Supported News and co-host of Political Misfits on Sputnik Radio.

He was formerly an analyst and case officer for the Central Intelligence Agency (CIA), senior investigator for the Senate Foreign Relations Committee, counterterrorism and a consultant for ABC News. He was the first U.S. government official to confirm in December 2007 that waterboarding was used to interrogate al-Qaeda prisoners, which he described as torture.

In 2012, Kiriakou became the first CIA officer to be convicted of passing classified information to a reporter disclosing the identity of a CIA officer. He received a 30-month sentence for this whistleblowing.

Early life and education
Kiriakou was born on August 9, 1964, the son of elementary school educators in Sharon, Pennsylvania, and raised in nearby New Castle, Pennsylvania. His grandparents had immigrated from Greece. Kiriakou graduated from New Castle High School in 1982 and attended George Washington University in Washington, D.C., where he earned a bachelor's degree in Middle Eastern Studies and a master's degree in Legislative Affairs.

CIA career
Kiriakou was recruited into the CIA by a graduate school professor who had been a senior CIA official. Kiriakou spent the first eight years of his career as a Middle East analyst specializing on Iraq. He maintained a Top Secret/Sensitive Compartmented Information security clearance. He learned Arabic and, from 1994 to 1996, was assigned to the American Embassy in Manama, Bahrain, as an economic officer. He returned to Washington, D.C., and to work on Iraq until 1998 when he transferred to the CIA's Directorate of Operations. He became a counter-terrorism operations officer and worked in Athens, Greece, on Eurocommunist terrorism. In Greece, Kiriakou recruited foreign agents to spy for the United States, and was nearly assassinated by leftists. In 2000, Kiriakou returned to CIA Headquarters.

Following the September 11 terrorist attacks, Kiriakou was named Chief of Counterterrorist Operations in Pakistan. In that position, he led a series of military raids on al-Qaeda safehouses, capturing dozens of al-Qaeda fighters. Kiriakou led a raid on the night of March 28, 2002, in Faisalabad, Pakistan, capturing Abu Zubaydah, then thought to be al-Qaeda's third-ranking official. Following a 2002-2004 domestic assignment, Kiriakou resigned from the CIA in 2004.

Life after the CIA
From 2004 until 2008, Kiriakou worked as a senior manager in Big Four accounting firm Deloitte & Touche's competitive intelligence practice. From September 2008 until March 2009, Kiriakou was a terrorism consultant for ABC News. Following Senator John Kerry's (D-MA) ascension to the chairmanship of the Senate Foreign Relations Committee in 2009, Kiriakou became the committee's senior United States Senate investigator, focusing on the Middle East, international terrorism, piracy, and counter-narcotics issues. In 2011, he left the committee to become managing partner of Rhodes Global Consulting, an Arlington, Virginia-based political risk analysis firm. From April 2011 to April 2012, he resumed counter-terrorism consulting for ABC News. He speaks often at colleges and universities around the country about the CIA, terrorism, torture, and ethics in intelligence operations.

Disclosing torture 
On December 10, 2007, Kiriakou gave an interview to ABC News in which he described his participation in the capture of Abu Zubaydah, who was accused of having been an aide to Al-Qaeda leader Osama bin Laden. Kiriakou said that he did not witness Zubaydah's interrogation, but had been told by CIA associates that it had taken only a single brief instance of waterboarding to extract answers:

Following the interview, Kiriakou's accounts of Abu Zubaydah's waterboarding were widely repeated and paraphrased, and he became a regular guest expert on news and public affairs shows on the topics of interrogation and counter-terrorism.

In 2009, however, it was reported that Abu Zubaydah had been waterboarded at least 83 times, and that little or no useful additional information may have been gained by "harsh methods" of interrogation.

Kiriakou has said that he chose not to blow the whistle on torture through internal channels because he believed he "wouldn't have gotten anywhere" because his superiors and the congressional intelligence committees were already aware of it.

Trial, sentence, and imprisonment
Nearly five years after the Justice Department had concluded Kiriakou committed no crime by giving his 2007 ABC interview, the CIA approached the new Obama Justice Department, already engaged in its own unprecedented crackdown on government leaks, and asked them to reopen the case.<ref name= On January 23, 2012, Kiriakou was charged with disclosing classified information to journalists, including the name of a covert CIA officer and information revealing the role of another CIA employee, Deuce Martinez, in classified activities. In addition, Kiriakou was alleged to have lied to the CIA to have his book published. His lawyer was Robert Trout. Lawyer and whistleblower Jesselyn Radack told Politico that the government was wrong to deny Kiriakou's whistleblower status.

According to PEN America:The specific charges were that in 2008, Kiriakou confirmed the name of a CIA officer—which was already well known to people in the human rights community, according to the Government Accountability Project—to someone who claimed to be writing a book about the agency's rendition practices. In a separate 2008 incident, Kiriakou gave a New York Times journalist the business card of a CIA agent who worked for a "private government contractor known for its involvement in torture." That agent had never been undercover and his contact information and affiliation with the CIA was already publicly available on the Internet. Kiriakou faced up to 45 years in prison and millions of dollars in legal fees for these charges. In October 2012, he agreed to plead guilty to one charge of having violated the Intelligence Identities Protection Act by giving a CIA agent's name to a reporter, and was sentenced to 30 months in jail.

On April 5, 2012, Kiriakou was indicted for one count of violating the Intelligence Identities Protection Act, three counts of violating the Espionage Act, and one count of making false statements for allegedly lying to the Publications Review Board of the CIA. On April 13, Kiriakou pleaded not guilty to all charges and was released on bail.

Starting September 12, 2012, the District Court for the Eastern District of Virginia conducted closed Classified Information Procedures Act hearings in Kiriakou's case. On October 22, 2012, he agreed to plead guilty to one count of passing classified information to the media thereby violating the Intelligence Identities Protection Act; his plea deal spared journalists from testifying in a trial. All other charges were dropped.

On January 25, 2013, Kiriakou was sentenced to 30 months in prison, making him the second CIA officer to be jailed for revealing classified material of CIA undercover identities, in violation of the Intelligence Identities Protection Act, after the 1985 arrest and conviction of Sharon Scranage. New York Times reporter Scott Shane referenced the Kiriakou case when he told NPR that Obama's prosecutions of journalism-related leaking were having a chilling effect on coverage of national security issues.

In January 2013, Bruce Riedel, a former intelligence adviser to Barack Obama who turned down an offer to be considered for CIA director in 2009, sent the President a letter signed by eighteen other CIA veterans urging that the sentence be commuted.
Kiriakou received a prison "send off" party at an exclusive Washington, D.C., hotel hosted by political peace activists dressed in orange jumpsuits and mock prison costumes.

On February 28, 2013, Kiriakou began serving his term at the low-security Federal Correctional Institution, Loretto in Loretto, Pennsylvania.

In summer 2013, Kiriakou wrote an open "Letter From Loretto" to Edward Snowden, published by the blog Firedoglake, expressing his support and giving advice, including "the most important advice that I can offer, DO NOT, under any circumstances, cooperate with the FBI". He warned Snowden to anticipate FBI officials wearing clandestine listening devices who may attempt to betray and entrap him into making comments that, heard out of context, would seem incriminating.

On February 3, 2015, Kiriakou was released from prison to serve three months of house arrest at his home in Arlington, Virginia. Following his release, Kiriakou said his case was not about leaking information but about exposing torture, continuing, "and I would do it all over again." He has since expressed interest in campaigning for prison reform.

In July 2018, Kiriakou signed a $50,000 agreement with an advisor to Donald Trump as payment for lobbying for a pardon, with the promise of an additional $50,000 as a bonus if it was granted.

Veteran Intelligence Professionals for Sanity

Kiriakou is a founding member of the organization Veteran Intelligence Professionals for Sanity (VIPS). In September 2015, Kiriakou and 27 other members of VIPS' steering committee wrote a letter to President Barack Obama challenging a recently published book that claimed to rebut the report of the Senate Intelligence Committee on the Central Intelligence Agency's use of torture.

Views

On the National Endowment for Democracy
In January 2022, Kiriakou commented to Declassified UK about their allegations that the National Endowment for Democracy (NED), a non-profit corporation funded by the United States Congress, had funnelled millions of dollars into British independent media groups since 2016. He said: "In 2011, the US Congress changed the law that forbade the Executive Branch from propagandizing the American people or nationals of the other 'Five Eyes' countries—the UK, Canada, Australia, and New Zealand. The National Endowment for Democracy, like Radio Free Europe/Radio Liberty, countless Washington-area 'think tanks', and Radio/TV Martí [the US broadcaster that transmits to Cuba], are the vehicles for that propaganda.... And what better way to spread that propaganda than to funnel money to 'friendly' outlets in 'friendly countries'? The CIA's propaganda efforts throughout history have been shameless. But now that they're not legally relegated to just Russia and China, the whole world is a target."

Books
In his writing, Kiriakou continues to advocate for increased transparency in governmental agencies.

 The Reluctant Spy: My Secret Life in the CIA's War on Terror (Bantam, 2010) discusses the CIA's response to 9/11 and their involvement in the Middle East during the George W. Bush administration.
 The Convenient Terrorist: Abu Zubaydah and the Weird Wonderland of America's Secret Wars (Skyhorse, 2017) is an  account of the hunt for Abu Zubaydah, his capture, interrogation, torture, and incarceration at Guantanamo.
 Doing Time Like a Spy: How the CIA Taught Me to Survive and Thrive in Prison (Rare Bird Books, 2017) is a memoir about Kiriakou's 23-month prison term, which he began serving on February 28, 2013, for passing classified information to the media, thereby violating the Intelligence Identities Protection Act. The book includes Kiriakou's blog series "Letters From Loretto" in addition to discussion of the American prison system. Barry Eisler, Jane Mayer, and Daniel Ellsberg, former members of and commentators on the intelligence community, endorsed this book, according to the publisher's website.
 The CIA Insider's Guide to the Iran Crisis (2020)

Awards 
The CIA awarded Kiriakou with 10 Exceptional Performance Awards, a Sustained Superior performance Award, the Counterterrorism Service Medal, and the State Department's Meritorious Honor Award. Kiriakou won the 2012 Joe A. Callaway Award for Civic Courage, which is awarded to "national security whistleblowers who stood up for constitutional rights and American values, at great risk to their personal and professional lives". In 2016, he was awarded the Sam Adams Award. Also in 2016, he was given the prestigious PEN First Amendment Award by the PEN Center USA.

Related media works 
In 2014, Silenced, a documentary featuring Kiriakou by James Spione, was released. The film explored the US government's response to whistleblowers who disclosed covert violations of constitutional privacy laws and terrorism laws. The film revealed in detail the personal toll on Kiriakou, military veteran Thomas Andrews Drake and attorney Jesselyn Radack, each of whom had questioned practices or reported crimes within the NSA, CIA, military, and other organizations.

See also
Alfreda Frances Bikowsky
Stephen Jin-Woo Kim, charged under the Espionage Act for allegedly disclosing to a reporter that North Korea might test a nuclear bomb
Chelsea Manning, convicted in July 2013 of violations of the Espionage Act 
Reality Winner, convicted in 2017 for revealing US intelligence had evidence of Russian attempts to hack voting machines
Plame affair, CIA agent name leaked and Scooter Libby prosecuted from the investigation
Jeffrey Alexander Sterling, charged with violating the Espionage Act for allegedly revealing details about Operation Merlin
Yours Truly, a 2019 documentary film on the artist and activist Ai Weiwei, featuring an interview with John Kiriakou

Notes

References

Further reading
 
 Radack, Jesselyn. "Feds ready whistleblower trial." Salon. April 13, 2012.

External links

USA v John Kiriakou: Selected Case Files from the Federation of American Scientists

The VICE News Interview: John Kiriakou, April 3, 2015; Interview conducted by Kaj Larsen 
 CIA Whistleblower John C. Kiriakou: the Gonzo Today Interview
 John Kiriakou discussion with Greek MEP Stelios Kouloglou (in English with 1 minute introduction in Greek).

1964 births
Living people
People from Sharon, Pennsylvania
People from New Castle, Pennsylvania
Writers from Pennsylvania
People of the Central Intelligence Agency
American whistleblowers
People convicted under the Espionage Act of 1917
Espionage writers
American political writers
American male non-fiction writers
American columnists
American writers of Greek descent
George Washington University alumni
21st-century American male writers
21st-century American non-fiction writers